is a Japanese footballer player who plays as a centre-back for  club Roasso Kumamoto.

Career
Makoto Okazaki joined FC Tokyo in 2016. On March 13, he debuted in J3 League (v SC Sagamihara).

In November 2022, it was announced Okazaki would be transferring to J2 League club Roasso Kumamoto after seven seasons with boyhood club FC Tokyo.

Club statistics
.

References

External links
Profile at FC Tokyo

1998 births
Living people
Association football people from Tokyo
Japanese footballers
J1 League players
J2 League players
J3 League players
FC Tokyo players
FC Tokyo U-23 players
Shimizu S-Pulse players
Roasso Kumamoto players
Association football defenders
Japan youth international footballers
Footballers at the 2018 Asian Games
Asian Games silver medalists for Japan
Asian Games medalists in football
Medalists at the 2018 Asian Games